Lisara (also Romanized as Līsarā; also known as Līsārā Maḩalleh) is a village in Khotbehsara Rural District, Karganrud District, Talesh County, Guilan Province, Iran. At the 2006 census, its population was 1,462, in 337 families.

References 

Populated places in Talesh County